The Sing Lei Hap Gei Lime Kiln Factory is an abandoned lime production facility on the island of Peng Chau in Hong Kong.

History
The factory, originally consisting of two buildings, was established in the 19th century and was one of 11 lime kilns present on the island of Peng Chau. The current building was constructed during the 1920s. The lime was produced by burning oyster shells, clam shells, and coral. Lime from the kiln was used in a variety of industries including construction and paper-making. The development of more modern materials led to the decline in business for the kilns in the 1950s.

The kiln was able to maintain operation, even during the Japanese occupation of Hong Kong during the Second World War. However, as lime became an obsolete material during the 1950s, the factory was finally closed during the 1970s.

Heritage Status
The building was submitted to the Antiquities Advisory Board for consideration as a heritage building under the Antiquities and Monuments Ordinance on the 19th of March 2009, which was granted on 20 Sept 2010. This was largely done to preserve the building, which was beginning to fall into dilapidation, by opening up avenues of potential funding to cover the cost of the upkeep of the building for the owner under the Financial Assistance for Maintenance Scheme.

See also
 Heritage conservation in Hong Kong

References

External links

 Antiquities Advisory Board. Pictures of Sing Lei Hap Gei Lime Kiln Factory

 
Lime kilns in Hong Kong